Singapur Road Jn. is a junction station near Rayagada in Odisha where Koraput–Rayagada railway line meets Vizianagaram–Raipur mainline.

The railway station
Singapur Road Jn. railway station of East Coast Railway is located at an elevation of 248 m. It has the station code of SPRD and is under the jurisdiction of Waltair railway division. It has two railway platforms.

History
The Parvatipuram–Raipur line was completed in 1931.

The Koraput–Rayagada Rail Link Project was completed on 31 December 1998.

References

External links
   Trains at Singapuram Road

Railway stations in Rayagada district
Waltair railway division
Railway stations opened in 1931